HD 30562 b is an extrasolar planet which orbits the F-type main sequence star HD 30562, located approximately 85.4 light years away in the constellation Eridanus.

This planet is unusual that it orbits in a very oval path like comets in the Solar System. The semimajor axis of the orbit is 2.30 AU and it ranges from 0.55 AU to 4.05 AU. It has minimum mass 1.29 times that of Jupiter. The orbital period of this planet is 38 months compared with 12 months for the Earth.

This eccentric Jupiter was discovered on August 12, 2009 by using the radial velocity method which was designed to study the wobble of stars cause by their planet's gravity over the course of their orbit. Another study confirmed it in 2012.

References 

Exoplanets discovered in 2009
Giant planets
Eridanus (constellation)
Exoplanets detected by radial velocity